The Letter may refer to:

Literature
 "The Letter" (poem), a poem by Wilfred Owen (1893–1918)
 "The Letter", a short story in W. Somerset Maugham's 1926 collection The Casuarina Tree
"The Letter", 38th sura of the Qur'an
The Letters (novel), 2008 romance novel

Film
 The Letter (1929 film), directed by Jean de Limur starring Jeanne Eagels, adapted from the Somerset Maugham play
 The Letter (1940 film), directed by William Wyler starring Bette Davis, also adapted from the Somerset Maugham play
The Letter (1982 film), a TV film
 The Letter (1997 film), a South Korean film also known as Pyeon ji
 The Letter (2004 film), a Thai remake of the 1997 Korean film, also known as Jod mai rak
 The Letter (1999 film), a Portuguese film by Manoel de Oliveira
The Letter (2003 film), American documentary about immigration in Maine
 The Letter, a 2002 short film directed by Dylan Griffith starring Blaine Hogan
 The Letter (2012 film), an American film starring Winona Ryder and James Franco
 The Letters (2014 film), film based on the life of Mother Teresa
 The Letter (2019 film), a Kenyan documentary film
 The Letter: A Message for our Earth, a 2022 documentary about Pope Francis Laudato si''' encyclical and environmental champions from around the world.

Music
 The Letter (Judy Garland album), 1959
 "The Letter" (Box Tops song), 1967, later covered by Joe Cocker
 The Letter/Neon Rainbow, a 1967 album by the Box Tops
 "The Letter" (Conway Twitty and Loretta Lynn song), 1976
 "The Letter", a 2003 song by A-Teens
 "The Letter," a song by Outkast from their 2003 album Speakerboxxx/The Love Below "The Letter", a song by PJ Harvey from her 2004 album Uh Huh Her "The Letter", a song by James Morrison from his 2006 debut album Undiscovered "The Letter" (Midnight Youth song), 2008
 "The Letter" (Hoobastank song), 2009
 "The Letter" (The Veils song), 2009
 The Letter (opera), a 2009 opera to be presented by the Santa Fe Opera and based on the 1927 play by W. Somerset Maugham
 The Letter (Avant album), 2010
 The Letter (Cosa Brava album), 2012
 "The Letter", a 2013 single from Davichi
 The Letter (Lemar album), 2015
 "The Letter", a song by Eleanor Friedberger from her 2018 album ReboundTelevision
 The Letter, a 1982 television movie starring Lee Remick
 "The Letter" (Seinfeld), a 1992 episode of the TV series Seinfeld "The Letter", an episode of the TV series Miracles (2003)

Video games
The Letter (video game), a 2014 mystery horror video game for the Wii U eShop

Other
 The Letter (play), a 1927 drama by W. Somerset Maugham from his own short story of the same name
 The Letter (painting)'', a 1660-1665 painting by Gerard ter Borch

See also
 Letter (disambiguation)